Tha' Rayne was an American R&B singing girl group that was formed in 2000 and disbanded in mid–2005. Tha' Rayne was a trio consisted of two singing members and a DJ. The original members of the group were Yummy Bingham and Shaquana Elam (now known as Quana BelleVoix), who shared lead vocals on all of the group's recordings.

Biography
The group was founded in 2000 by producer KayGee from Naughty by Nature, who recruited Elizabeth "Yummy" Bingham, Shaquana "Quana" Elam and Tina "Tina-J" Jenkins. Each was looking for a solo deal and then discovered it would be for a girl group.

The first and only recording where the three original members appear together is Jaheim and Lil' Mo's "Finders Keepers" (2001), performing vocal backup. After Tina-J left the group, Tha' Rayne remained a duet and signed in April 2001, with Arista Records's CEO Antonio "L.A." Reid. They released Rock wit Me in April 2002, followed in July by "No L.O.V.E." (re-recorded by Jhené Aiko in 2003). While preparing their debut album, originally expected for an October 2002 release, Tha' Rayne collaborated with artists such as Boyz II Men, Jaheim, Queen Latifah, and Next.

In August 2002, Kay Gee had the vision to create an R&B version of Salt-N-Pepa and added  Michelle "DJ Myche Luv" Colon, a young female DJ.

In Fall 2002, Tha' Rayne appeared on Jaheim's hit single "Fabulous".

In January 2003, the group went through a change of the lineup with the departure of DJ Myche Luv, who was replaced on January 27, 2003 by Qiana "DJ Qi" Drew. Soon after, Tha' Rayne released "Didn't You Know" (featuring Joe Budden and Lupe Fiasco), their first single to chart, reaching number 75 on the Billboard Hot R&B/Hip-Hop Songs chart. It was produced by Rich Harrison but did not get the buzz expected by the label, so their debut album Reign Supreme was delayed.

When Arista merged into Sony BMG in early 2004 and Antonio "L.A." Reid was fired, many of his artists were dropped, including Tha' Rayne. The group decided to split, with each member going solo, but KayGee convinced Quana to reform the group with DJ Myche Luv and a new member named Hadiya Nelson a.k.a. Deeyah. This new version of the group recorded a demo but disbanded a year later in August 2005.

Discography

Singles

References

African-American girl groups
American girl groups
American pop music groups
American rhythm and blues musical groups
Arista Records artists